Walter Wolf (27 February 1907 in Gotha – 2 April 1977 in Potsdam) was a German politician and member of the Communist Party of Germany (KPD).

Wolf was the culture minister of Thuringia from 1945 until 1947.

References 

1907 births
1977 deaths
People from Gotha (town)
University of Jena alumni
Academic staff of Leipzig University
Academic staff of the University of Potsdam
East German politicians
Communist Party of Germany politicians
Buchenwald concentration camp survivors